Whittall is a surname. Notable people with the surname include:

Andy Whittall (born 1973), Zimbabwean cricketer
Arnold Whittall (born 1935), British musicologist and writer
Beth Whittall (1936–2015), Canadian competitive swimmer
Edward Whittall (1851-1917), British-Ottoman merchant and plant collector
Guy Whittall (born 1972), Zimbabwean cricketer
James Whittall (1800s), British businessman in Hong Kong
Sam Whittall (born 1993), British footballer 
Ted Whittall, British-born Canadian actor
Zoe Whittall (born 1976), Canadian poet, novelist and TV writer